Carla dal Forno is an Australian electro-pop singer and multi-instrumentalist. Formerly of the groups Mole House (2010–2013) and F ingers (2013–2017), dal Forno has issued three solo studio albums You Know What It's Like (2016), Look Up Sharp (2019) and Come Around (2022).

Career 
Carla dal Forno began her music career in Melbourne in 2010, playing in bands while also completing a degree in fine arts. She collaborated with friends Micky Zulicki and Pat Breen in a group, Mole House, which released music on Zulicki's Quemada Records and were active between 2010-2013. Dal Forno also released music as a member of F ingers ( Fingers Pty Ltd) alongside Sam Karmel and Tarquin Manek, and in the duo Tarcar with Manek. AllMusic's Paul Simpson described F ingers as creating "sparse, haunting darkwave folk with shadowy vocals, spacious acoustic guitars, fluid bass guitar, and sparingly used synthesizer."

The artist relocated to Berlin where she worked on her debut solo album from 2014. You Know What It's Like was released by London-based label Blackest Ever Black in October 2016. Her performance at London's The Islington in February 2017 was caught by Ripes Blake Creighton, who observed "she engaged everyone through her soft, dark and subtle instrumentals and vocals. Everyone was left feeling a sense of emotional connection after each track." She hosted a monthly show on NTS Radio during 2017.

Following Blackest Ever Black's closure in 2019, dal Forno released her second album Look Up Sharp on her own Kallista Records, while living in London. By 2022 she had moved to Castlemaine, Victoria and released her third solo album Come Around late that year. Its title track was issued as a single in August. Simpson observed that dal Forno's solo work spans post-punk, dub and ambient pop genres.

Personal life 
Carla dal Forno and her domestic partner Sanjay Fernandes are the parents of a child. During late 2020 they attempted to return to Melbourne from London amidst the COVID-19 pandemic in Australia. By late 2022 dal Forno was living in Castlemaine.

Discography

Albums 
Solo
 You Know What It's Like (October 2016) – Blackest Ever Black 
 Look Up Sharp (2019) – Kallista Records 
 Come Around (2022) – Kallista Records

F ingers
 Broken Fingers  (2013) – Night People 
 Hide Before Dinner (2015)) – Blackest Ever Black 
 Awkwardly Blissing Out (2017) – Blackest Ever Black

Extended plays 
Solo
 The Garden (2017) – Blackest Ever Black 

Mole House
 Mole House (2012) – Night People 

Tarcar
 Mince Glace (2014) – Blackest Ever Black

Singles 
Solo
 "Fast Moving Cars" (2016)
 "So Much Better" (2019)
 "Come Around" (2022)
 "Side by Side" (2022)

Mole House
 "Hey Come My Way" (2012) – Quemada Records

References 

Musicians from Melbourne
Year of birth missing (living people)
Living people